Marcelo Gil Fernando or simple Marcelinho, born on 28 March 1990 in Osasco, São Paulo, is a professional Brazilian football player. He currently plays for XV de Piracicaba.

Career 
In 2009, he was Corinthians top scorer in the Copa São Paulo de Futebol Júnior. As a backup, he was also part of the team, who won the Brazil Cup and Championship the same year. But than he played on loan for different Brazilian teams.

In February 2013 he signed a contract with Karpaty Lviv in Ukrainian Premier League.

Honours
Corinthians
Campeonato Paulista: 2009
Copa do Brasil: 2009

Ituano
Campeonato Paulista: 2014

References

External links

1990 births
Living people
Brazilian footballers
Brazilian expatriate footballers
FC Karpaty Lviv players
Grêmio Barueri Futebol players
Sport Club Corinthians Paulista players
Atlético Monte Azul players
Associação Atlética Ponte Preta players
Mirassol Futebol Clube players
Ituano FC players
Oeste Futebol Clube players
Paraná Clube players
Vila Nova Futebol Clube players
Esporte Clube São Bento players
Esporte Clube XV de Novembro (Piracicaba) players
Ukrainian Premier League players
Campeonato Brasileiro Série A players
Campeonato Brasileiro Série B players
Campeonato Brasileiro Série D players
People from Osasco
Association football forwards
Expatriate footballers in Ukraine
Brazilian expatriate sportspeople in Ukraine
Footballers from São Paulo (state)